Asquith is a town in south-central Saskatchewan, Canada, approximately  west of Saskatoon. It became a village in December 1907. According to the 2011 Census, its population is 603.

The site was largely the original lands settled by Ontario pioneers Andrew Mather and Jennet Mather, née Ainslie.

Demographics 

See also
 List of communities in Saskatchewan
 List of towns in Saskatchewan

References

External links

Towns in Saskatchewan
Division No. 12, Saskatchewan